p-Toluenesulfonic acid (PTSA or pTsOH) or tosylic acid (TsOH) is an organic compound with the formula CH3C6H4SO3H. It is a white extremely hygroscopic solid that is soluble in water, alcohols, and other polar organic solvents. The CH3C6H4SO2 group is known as the tosyl group and is often abbreviated as Ts or Tos. Most often, TsOH refers to the monohydrate, TsOH.H2O.

As with other aryl sulfonic acids, TsOH is a strong organic acid.  It is about one million times stronger than benzoic acid.  It is one of the few strong acids that is solid and therefore is conveniently weighed and stored.

Preparation and uses
TsOH is prepared on an industrial scale by the sulfonation of toluene. Common impurities include benzenesulfonic acid and sulfuric acid.  TsOH monohydrate contains an amount of water. To estimate the total moisture present as impurity, the Karl Fischer method is used. Impurities can be removed by recrystallization from its concentrated aqueous solution followed by azeotropic drying with toluene.

TsOH finds use in organic synthesis as an "organic-soluble" strong acid.  Examples of uses include:
Acetalization of an aldehyde.
Fischer–Speier esterification
Transesterification reactions

Tosylates
Alkyl tosylates are alkylating agents because tosylate is electron-withdrawing as well as a good leaving group.  Tosylate is a pseudohalide.  Toluenesulfonate esters undergo nucleophilic attack or elimination.  Reduction of tosylate esters gives the hydrocarbon.  Thus, tosylation followed by reduction allows for the deoxygenation of alcohols.

In a famous and illustrative use of tosylate, 2-norbornyl cation was displaced from the 7-norbornenyl tosylate.  The elimination occurs 1011 times faster than the solvolysis of anti-7-norbornyl p-toluenesulfonate.

Tosylates are also protecting group for alcohols.  They are prepared by combining the alcohol with 4-toluenesulfonyl chloride, usually in an aprotic solvent, often pyridine.

Reactions
 TsOH may be converted to p-toluenesulfonic anhydride by heating with phosphorus pentoxide.
 When heated with acid and water, TsOH undergoes hydrolysis to toluene:
CH3C6H4SO3H   +  H2O   → C6H5CH3  +  H2SO4

This reaction is general for aryl sulfonic acids.

See also
Tosyl
Collidinium p-toluenesulfonate

References

Benzenesulfonic acids
Reagents for organic chemistry
Acid catalysts
Sulfonic acids
P-Tosyl compounds